Events from the year 1858 in the United Kingdom.

Incumbents
 Monarch – Victoria
 Prime Minister – Henry Temple, 3rd Viscount Palmerston (Whig) (until 19 February); Edward Smith-Stanley, 14th Earl of Derby (Conservative) (starting 20 February)
 Parliament – 17th

Events
 January – first GPO wall-mounted post boxes put into place and agreed for general adoption.
 25 January – the "Wedding March" by Felix Mendelssohn becomes a popular wedding recessional after it is played on this day at the marriage of Queen Victoria's daughter Victoria, "Vicky" the Princess Royal, to Prince Friedrich of Prussia in St James's Palace, London.
 30 January – Hallé Orchestra founded by Charles Hallé in Manchester.
 31 January – I. K. Brunel's , the largest ship built to date, is launched on the River Thames.
 13 February – Richard Francis Burton and John Hanning Speke become the first Europeans to discover Lake Tanganyika.
 21 February – Palmerston resigns as Prime Minister, following the rejection of a counter-terrorism bill in the wake of the Orsini affair; he is replaced by Earl of Derby, forming a new Conservative government.
 1 March – The English Woman's Journal is established by Barbara Bodichon, Matilda Hays, Bessie Rayner Parkes (the editor) and others to discuss women's equality issues.
 10 April – Big Ben, the Great Bell for the Palace of Westminster's clock tower in London, is recast at Whitechapel Bell Foundry.
 29 April – Charles Dickens embarks on his first professional tour giving readings from his works; this will comprise 129 appearances in 49 different towns throughout England, Scotland and Ireland.
 May – Court for Divorce and Matrimonial Causes first sits (with Sir Cresswell Cresswell as judge in ordinary) following coming into effect of the Matrimonial Causes Act 1857 making civil divorce without parliamentary approval legally possible.
 3 May – William Powell Frith's painting The Derby Day is first exhibited at the Royal Academy, attracting crowds.
 15 May – new Royal Opera House, Covent Garden, opens.
 24 June – the Sovereign and Illustrious Order of Saint John of Jerusalem, Anglia declared.
 1 July – papers by Charles Darwin and Alfred Russel Wallace announcing a theory of evolution by natural selection read at the Linnean Society of London.
 2 July – The Great Stink: the stench of sewage from the River Thames affects work in the House of Commons.
 17 July – salvage of the Lutine bell, which is subsequently hung in Lloyd's of London.
 26 July – Lionel de Rothschild takes his seat as the first Jewish Member of Parliament.
 28 July – in Bengal, British official William Herschel uses a hand impression of Rajyadhar Konai as a contract fingerprint signature.
 2 August
 Medical Act 1858 passed "to Regulate the Qualifications of Practitioners in Medicine and Surgery".
 British Empire takes over powers and properties of the British East India Company.
 3 August – explorer John Hanning Speke discovers Lake Victoria, source of the River Nile.
 16 August – US President James Buchanan inaugurates the new trans-Atlantic telegraph cable by exchanging greetings with Queen Victoria. However, a weak signal will force a shutdown of the service in a few weeks.
 26 August – the Anglo-Japanese Treaty of Amity and Commerce signed.
 August – reforming educator Dorothea Beale takes up her duties as Principal of Cheltenham Ladies' College.
 1 September
 Local Government Act 1858 comes into force; General Board of Health abolished.
 Lighthouse on Bishop Rock, Isles of Scilly, first illuminated.
 30 October – Bradford sweets poisoning: 21 people are killed and 200 more suffer arsenic poisoning when arsenic is accidentally substituted for plaster in adulterating sweets sold in Bradford market.
 1 December – the recently-formed Odontological Society of London opens the Dental Hospital of London.

Undated
 Mirror galvanometer invented by William Thomson, 1st Baron Kelvin.
 The Miners Association established in Cornwall.

Publications
 Frederic Farrar's moral schoolboy novel Eric, or, Little by Little.
 Anthony Trollope's novel Doctor Thorne.

Births
 22 January
 Frederick Lugard, 1st Baron Lugard, soldier, explorer and colonial administrator (died 1945)
 Beatrice Webb, née Potter, socialist, economist and reformer (died 1943)
 26 January – Arthur Winnington-Ingram, Bishop of London (died 1946)
 10 March – Henry Watson Fowler, lexicographer (died 1933)
 23 April – Ethel Smyth, composer and a leader of the women's suffrage movement (died 1944)
 26 May – Horace Smith-Dorrien, general (died 1930)
 8 June – Charlotte Scott, mathematician (died 1931)
 14 July – Emmeline Pankhurst, suffragette (died 1928)
 15 August – E. Nesbit, children's novelist (died 1924)
 19 August
 Alfred Dyke Acland, military officer (died 1937)
 Ellen Willmott, horticulturalist (died 1934)
 16 September
 Edward Marshall Hall, defence barrister (died 1927)
 Bonar Law, Canadian-born Prime Minister of the United Kingdom (died 1923)
 11 October – Frederick Kerr, actor (died 1933)
 20 October – John Burns, trade unionist, politician and historian (died 1943)

Deaths
 4 January – Amelia Griffiths, phycologist (born 1768)
 8 January – Caroline Cornwallis, scholar, writer and reformer (born 1786)
 7 April – Henry Piddington, merchant captain in the East (born 1797)
 17 April – James Abercromby, 1st Baron Dunfermline, politician (born 1776)
 10 June – Robert Brown, botanist (born 1773)
 16 June – John Snow, epidemiologist (born 1813)
 28 June – Jane Marcet, science writer (born 1769)
 9 September – Thomas Assheton Smith, politician and cricketer (born 1776)
 3 November – Harriet Taylor Mill, philosopher and women's rights advocate (born 1807)
 17 November – Robert Owen, founder of the Co-operative Society (born 1771)
 20 November – Sir Joseph Bailey, 1st Baronet, ironmaster (born 1783)
 23 November – Edmund Lyons, 1st Baron Lyons, admiral (born 1790)
 28 November – Robert Pearse Gillies, Scottish poet and writer (born 1789)
 29 December – Richard Cheslyn, cricketer (born 1797)

See also
 1858 in Scotland

References

 
Years of the 19th century in the United Kingdom